Podoplanin is a protein that in humans is encoded by the PDPN gene.

Structure and function 
Podoplanin is a mucin-type protein with a mass of 36- to 43-kDa. It is relatively well conserved between species, with homologues in humans, mice, rats, dogs and hamsters.

This gene encodes a type-I, integral membrane, heavily O-glycosylated glycoprotein with diverse distribution in human tissues. The physiological function of this protein may be related to its mucin-type character. The homologous protein in other species has been described as a differentiation antigen and influenza-virus receptor. The specific function of this protein has not been determined but it has been proposed as a marker of lung injury. Alternatively spliced transcript variants encoding different isoforms have been identified.

This protein has been found to have functions in lung alveolar cells, kidney podocytes, and lymphatic endothelial cells. More recently, this protein has been found in neural tissue in both mouse and human samples.

In lymphatic endothelial cells, experimentation has indicated that podoplanin plays a role in proper formation of linkages between the cardiovascular system and the lymphatic systems, typically causing fatty liver disease in these mice.

Although the exact function is unknown in many tissues, podoplanin is generally receptive to detection via immunofluorescent staining and has been shown to co-localize with the protein nestin, a type VI intermediate filament protein expressed almost primarily in neural tissues. Currently, the only protein known to interact with podoplanin physiologically is CLEC-2, a C-type lectin 2 expressed on platelets and on hematopoietic cells. Both serve a role in the proper formation of blood/lymphatic connections in embryonic development.

Clinical significance 
PDPN has been studied extensively in the cancer field. It is a specific lymphatic vessel marker, and since lymphangiogenesis levels are correlated with poor prognosis in cancer patients, it can be used as a diagnostic marker. It is often upregulated in certain types of cancer, including several types of squamous cell carcinomas, malignant mesothelioma and brain tumors. Moreover, it can be upregulated by cancer-associated fibroblasts (CAFs) in the tumor stroma, where it has been associated with poor prognosis.

In squamous cell carcinomas, PDPN is believed to play a key role in the cancer cell invasiveness by controlling invadopodia, and thus mediating efficient ECM degradation.

References

Further reading

External links